Hypselobarbus kushavali is a genus of cyprinid in the genus Hypselobarbus. It inhabits the Kali River, Karnataka, India.

References

Cyprinidae
Cyprinid fish of Asia
Fish of India
Fish described in 2016